Bruce Grose is a former American football coach. He served as the head football coach at McPherson College in McPherson, Kansas for five seasons, from 1993 to 1997, and compiling a record of 15–33.

Head coaching record

References

Year of birth missing (living people)
Living people
McPherson Bulldogs football coaches